The Northeast Arkansas League was the name used by a pair of American minor league baseball leagues.   The first of these started operations in 1909 and continued through 1911.  The second version began operations for the 1936 season.  It continued through the 1941 season.

Cities represented 
Batesville, AR: Batesville White Sox 1936; Batesville White Sox 1938; Batesville Pilots 1940–1941 
Blytheville, AR: Blytheville 1910; Blytheville Tigers 1911; Blytheville Giants 1937–1938
Caruthersville, MO: Caruthersville 1910; Caruthersville Pilots 1936–1940 
Helena, AR: Helena Hustlers 1911 
Jonesboro, AR: Jonesboro Zebras 1909–1911; Jonesboro Giants 1936–1938; Jonesboro White Sox 1939–1941
Marianna, AR: Marianna Brickeys 1909 
Newport, AR: Newport Cardinals 1936–1938; Newport Canners 1939; Newport Dodgers 1940–1941 
Osceola, AR: Osceola Indians 1936–1937 
Newport, AR: Newport Pearl Diggers 1909 
Paragould, AR: Paragould Scouts 1909–1911; Paragould Rebels 1936–1938; Paragould Browns 1939–1940; Paragould Broncos 1941
West Plains, MO: West Plains Badgers 1936

Yearly standings

1909
The teams from Jonesboro, Arkansas and Newport, Arkansas left the Arkansas State League and joined. New teams were added in Marianna, Arkansas and Paragould, Arkansas.

1910
The teams in Marianna and Newport folded.  New teams in Blytheville, Arkansas and Caruthersville, Missouri came into the league.

1911
The Caruthersville team folded.  A new team from Helena, Arkansas came into the league.

The league, and all teams in it, folded.

1936
The league formed with new teams starting in Batesville, Arkansas, Jonesboro, Arkansas, Newport, Arkansas, Osceola, Arkansas, Paragould, Arkansas, and West Plains, Missouri.  The West Plains team moved to Caruthersville, Missouri on June 11.  Its record was 18-10 before the move, and 33-38 after it.

1937
Batesville folded.  A new team formed in Blytheville, Arkansas.

As Blytheville won both half of the season, it was determined to be the winner.

1938
Osceola folded.  A new team in Batesville, Arkansas formed.

1939
The teams in Batesville and Blytheville folded.

As Caruthersville won both halves of the season, there was no basis for a playoff.

1940
Caruthersville moved to Batesville, Arkansas on July 7.

1941

All teams and the league itself folded.

References

Sumner, Benjamin Barrett.  Minor League Baseball Standings:All North American Leagues, Through 1999.  Jefferson, N.C.:McFarland. 

Defunct minor baseball leagues in the United States
Baseball leagues in Arkansas
1909 establishments in Arkansas
1936 establishments in Arkansas
1911 disestablishments in Arkansas
1941 disestablishments in Arkansas